Triglycine sulfate (TGS) is a chemical compound with a formula (NH2CH2COOH)3·H2SO4. The empirical formula of TGS does not represent the molecular structure, which contains protonated glycine moieties and sulfate ions. TGS with protons replaced by deuterium is called deuterated TGS or DTGS; alternatively, DTGS may refer to doped TGS. By doping the DTGS with the amino acid L-Alanine, the crystal properties are improved and the new material is called Deuterated L-Alanine doped Triglycine Sulfate (DLATGS or DLTGS). These crystals are pyroelectric and ferroelectric which allows their use as photodetector elements in infrared spectroscopy and night vision applications. TGS detectors have also been used as the target in vidicon cathode ray imager tubes.

Crystal structure and properties

TGS crystals may be formed by evaporation of an aqueous solution of sulfuric acid and a greater than three-fold excess of glycine. They belong to the polar space group P21 and therefore are pyroelectric and ferroelectric at room temperature, exhibiting spontaneous polarization along the b-axis ([010] direction). The Curie temperature of the ferroelectric transition is 49 °C for TGS and 62 °C for DTGS. The crystal structure consists of SO42−, 2(N+H3CH2COOH) (G1 and G2 in the crystal-structure diagram), and +NH3CH2COO− (G3) species held together by hydrogen bonds. These bonds are easily broken by the polar molecules of water, which leads to the hygroscopicity of TGS – its crystals are easily etched by water. Along the b-axis, the G1-SO4 and G2-G3 layers are stacked alternately. The nearest two neighboring layers with identical chemical composition are rotated 180° around the b-axis against each other. DTGS and DLATGS materials are derivatives of TGS which have better pyroelectric properties and give less detector noise as can be shown in the following table.

Typical performance of DLATGS detectors 
The typical performance and pyroelectric properties of DLATGS detectors of 1.3 and 2.0 mm in diameter of the element size are shown in the table below.

References

Infrared sensor materials
Sulfates